The Sweet Hereafter is a bar and restaurant in Portland, Oregon.

Description
The Sweet Hereafter operates in a former Dixie Mattress Co. building on Belmont Street in southeast Portland's Sunnyside neighborhood. The small menu includes vegan rice bowls with jerk tofu and coconut kale, vegan and vegetarian sandwiches, as well as cocktails served in Mason jars. The bar's eponymous drink has vodka, bourbon, lemon, and iced tea. The Sweet Hereafter has a "prohibition vibe", according to Michael Russell of The Oregonian, as well as a covered patio.

History
Partners Jacob Carey, Ian David, Liam Duffy, Ben Hufford, John Janulis, and Clyde Wooten opened the Sweet Hereafter on July 26, 2011, via the Lightning Bar Collective (Jackknife Bar, Victoria Bar).

Reception
Grant Butler included the restaurant's tofu banh mi sandwich in The Oregonian 2012 list of "Portland's top 10 vegan dishes".

References

External links

 
 

2011 establishments in Oregon
Drinking establishments in Oregon
Restaurants established in 2011
Restaurants in Portland, Oregon
Sunnyside, Portland, Oregon